Ralph Joseph "Rube" Novotney (August 5, 1924 – July 16, 1987) was an American professional baseball player, a catcher who appeared in 22 Major League games for the  Chicago Cubs.

Novotney's partial season with the 1949 Cubs included two standout back-to-back games against the New York Giants at Wrigley Field. On June 25, Novotney singled twice in three at bats, driving in three runs and providing the margin in a 4–1 Cub victory. The following day, he was a perfect three-for-three off the Giants' Dave Koslo, but New York prevailed, 6–2.

In his MLB career, Novotney made 18 total hits (including two doubles and one triple) in 67 at-bats.

References

External links

1924 births
1987 deaths
Baseball players from Illinois
Chicago Cubs players
Lockport White Sox players
Los Angeles Angels (minor league) players
Major League Baseball catchers
Nashville Vols players
People from Streator, Illinois
Portsmouth Cubs players
Shelby Cubs players
Tulsa Oilers (baseball) players
Sportspeople from Redondo Beach, California